Ripcord was an American syndicated television series starring Ken Curtis that ran for a total of 76 episodes from 1961 to 1963 about the exploits of a skydiving operation of its namesake.

Premise

The premise was a variety of adventures surrounding the then-new, thrilling sport of skydiving. The two men and their private Cessna airplane were placed in unusual situations where their special skills and abilities were needed. This led them on exciting weekly adventures from chasing dangerous criminals to performing difficult and daring, if occasionally absurd, rescues.

Cast

Larry Pennell as Theodore "Ted" McKeever (skydiver) audacious, intrepid, clever, headstrong, brave.
Ken Curtis  as James "Jim" Buckley (skydiver) older, level-headed mentor to Ted McKeever.
Paul Comi as Chuck Lambert (airplane pilot) - this character was phased out midway through first season, replaced by...
Shug Fisher as Charlie Kern (airplane pilot) - replaced the Chuck Lambert character played by Paul Comi midway through first season.

Fisher and Curtis were bandmates in the musical group Sons of the Pioneers.

Production

The stuntmen performing the actual skydiving were Bob Fleming, an airline pilot, and Joe Mangione, both from Brooklyn, New York. Fleming also doubled as the pilot at the controls when not involved in the scene.

Cameramen included Tom Ryan, whose previous experience included early parachute development, testing, and design. Ryan was a pioneer in capturing closeup film footage of free-falling skydivers.

In 1962, the filming of the series involved the transfer of a stuntman between two airplanes, which was being filmed from a third aircraft. Due to air turbulence, the transfer failed and both aircraft touched and subsequently crashed. The pilots of both airplanes and the stuntman involved were able to parachute to safety. Later, the dramatic footage from this near tragic event was subsequently used in two Ripcord second season episodes.

Episodes

Season 1 (1961–1962)
 
 The Sky Diver - Pilot (Thursday September 28, 1961 - guest starred Russell Johnson)
 Air Carnival
 Airborne
 Chuting Stars (guest starred John Agar)
 Colorado Jump
 The Condemned (guest starred Michael Pataki)
 Counter-Attack
 Crime Jump (Thursday October 5, 1961 - guest starred Burt Reynolds)
 Dangerous Night, a.k.a. DARB (Distressed Airman Rescue Beacon) - guest starred Harry Townes 
 Death Camp
 Derelict
 Top Secret
 Radar Rescue (Thursday December 28, 1961 - guest starred John Considine and Jack Hogan)
 Sierra Jump
 The Silver Cord
 Thoroughbred
 Ransom Drop (guest starred Tracy Olsen)
 Escape
 Double Drop
 The Financier
 Sentence of Death
 Desperate Choice
 Diplomatic Mission (guest starred Richard Simmons)
 Hagen Charm (guest starred Arthur Franz)
 The Helicopter Race (Thursday March 15, 1962 - guest starred Dyan Cannon)
 Jungle Survivor
 High Jeopardy
 Hi-Jack
 The Human Kind
 Hurricane Charley
 Elegy for a Hero
 Cougar Mesa
 Last Chance
 Log Jam
 Mile High Triangle (Thursday May 31, 1962 - guest starred Walter Mathews, Page Slattery, Robert Sampson and Kathie Browne)
 Millionaire Doctor
 One for the Money
 Para-Nurse (guest starred Harry Carey, Jr. and Allison Hayes)

Season 2 (1962–63)

International broadcast

Ripcord aired in Brazil in the 1960s under its original title at the same time as in the United States.

Ripcord aired in the UK (under its original title) on BBC1 in 1964, with repeats airing the following year until October 1965.

Home media

On July 23, 2013, TGG Direct released both seasons of Ripcord as a Region 1 DVD.

Some of the Ripcord episodes can be found on YouTube, Veoh and Uncle Earl's Classic Television Channel.

Comic

 adapted the series into a comic strip.

Toy

This show sponsored a popular Ripcord tie-in toy, consisting of a large plastic parachute with a plastic skydiver figure attached to it, which could be thrown in the air and would float down to the ground, just like a real parachute. It was a big toy seller. At the end of every episode, Larry Pennell as Theodore (Ted) McKeever, along with Ken Curtis as James (Jim) Buckley, delivered a brief comment, addressing to viewers the importance of sport parachuting safety.

References

External links 
 

1961 American television series debuts
1963 American television series endings
Television series by MGM Television
First-run syndicated television programs in the United States
Black-and-white American television shows
American action television series
English-language television shows
Aviation television series
Skydiving in fiction
Television shows adapted into comics